Lê Văn Dương (born 21 September 1985) is a Vietnamese middle distance athlete whose main event is the 800 metres. Duong competed in the 2004 Summer Olympics. In his heat he came last but he still managed to break the national record with a time of 1:49.81. Overall, Duong came 64th place.

International competitions

Personal bests

References

External links
 

1985 births
Living people
People from Kiên Giang Province
Athletes (track and field) at the 2004 Summer Olympics
Olympic athletes of Vietnam
Vietnamese male middle-distance runners
Southeast Asian Games medalists in athletics
Southeast Asian Games gold medalists for Vietnam
Competitors at the 2003 Southeast Asian Games
Competitors at the 2005 Southeast Asian Games
20th-century Vietnamese people
21st-century Vietnamese people